Pierre Lapointe (died April 12, 2008) was a municipal politician in Montreal, Quebec, Canada. He served on the Montreal city council from 1998 until his death, originally as a member of Vision Montreal (VM) and later with the Montreal Island Citizens Union (MICU).

Lapointe was the brother of provincial politician Lisette Lapointe and the brother-in-law of her husband, Jacques Parizeau, who served as premier of Quebec from 1994 to 1996.

Political career
Lapointe was first elected to city council in the 1998 municipal election for the Fleury division. Vision Montreal won a council majority in this cycle, and Lapointe was a backbench supporter of Mayor Pierre Bourque's administration for the next three years. He was re-elected for the redistributed Ahuntsic division in the 2001 election; Vision Montreal was defeated by MICU, and he subsequently served as a member of the opposition.

Lapointe crossed the floor to join MICU on December 12, 2003. In February 2004, he was elected to MICU's executive committee as one of three members representing the elected party caucus. He was re-elected under his new party's banner in the 2005 campaign.

By virtue of holding his seat on city council, Lapointe also served as a member of the Ahuntsic-Cartierville borough council following the 2001 election. He died of cancer on April 12, 2008.

Electoral record

References

2008 deaths
Montreal city councillors
Year of birth missing